Víctor Manuel Espasandín Facal (born 16 March 1985) is a Spanish footballer who plays as a left back for New Zealand club Metro.

Club career
Born in A Coruña, Galicia, Espasandín finished his football formation at Real Valladolid, having joined from local SD Compostela. In the 2005–06 season he made his professional debut, playing one second division match; his fate did not improve in the following campaign as he only appeared in seven games (out of 42) for SD Ponferradina, which eventually got relegated.

Espasandín signed for FC Barcelona B in July 2007, helping the Catalans return to the third level in his debut season under young manager Pep Guardiola. In early June 2010, after helping Barça B return to division two after 11 years, he signed a contract with AC Omonia from Cyprus, joining the club alongside former Barcelona teammate José Manuel Rueda.

Honours
Omonia
Cypriot Cup: 2010–11
Cypriot Super Cup: 2010

References

External links

1985 births
Living people
Spanish footballers
Footballers from A Coruña
Association football defenders
Segunda División players
Segunda División B players
Tercera División players
SD Compostela footballers
Real Valladolid Promesas players
Real Valladolid players
SD Ponferradina players
FC Barcelona Atlètic players
CE Sabadell FC footballers
CF Pobla de Mafumet footballers
Cypriot First Division players
AC Omonia players
Spanish expatriate footballers
Expatriate footballers in Cyprus
Spanish expatriate sportspeople in Cyprus